Scafa is a comune and town in the Province of Pescara in the Abruzzo region of Italy. It has an exit of the motorway between Pescara and Rome.

References

Cities and towns in Abruzzo